East Dorset is a former United Kingdom Parliamentary constituency. It was formally known as the Eastern Division of Dorset. It was a constituency of the House of Commons of the Parliament of the United Kingdom. It was represented by one Knight of the Shire.

History
Before 1885 the historic county of Dorset, in south-west England, was an undivided three-seat county constituency - see the article on the Dorset constituency. In 1885 the county was divided for Parliamentary purposes into four single-member county constituencies: this constituency, North Dorset, South Dorset and West Dorset (no borough constituencies were created in Dorset in the 1885 redistribution). Each of these divisions comprised roughly a quarter of the area of the county and returned one Member of Parliament.

In the 1918 redistribution, the four Dorset constituencies were retained, but their boundaries were redrawn. East Dorset was reduced in area to about half its former size, with the northern part of the pre-1918 seat being transferred to North Dorset and the southern part to South Dorset.

In the 1950 redistribution, this constituency disappeared. A new borough constituency of Poole was created. Wimborne Minster Urban District and the part of Wimborne and Cranborne Rural District previously in the abolished seat were transferred to the redrawn North Dorset.

Boundaries
1885–1918: The Municipal Borough of Poole, the Sessional Division of Wimborne, and part of the Sessional Division of Wareham.

1918–1950: The Municipal Borough of Poole, the Urban District of Wimborne Minster, the Rural District of Poole, and part of the Rural District of Wimborne and Cranborne.

Members of Parliament

Elections

Elections in the 1880s

Elections in the 1890s
Bond's death caused a by-election.

Elections in the 1900s

Elections in the 1910s 

General Election 1914–15

Another General Election was required to take place before the end of 1915. The political parties had been making preparations for an election to take place from 1914 and by the end of this year, the following candidates had been selected; 
Liberal: Frederick Guest
Unionist:

Elections in the 1920s

Elections in the 1930s

Elections in the 1940s 
General Election 1939–40

Another General Election was required to take place before the end of 1940. The political parties had been making preparations for an election to take place from 1939 and by the end of this year, the following candidates had been selected; 
 Conservative: Mervyn Wheatley
 Liberal: David Hutton
 Labour: Hugh Ross Williamson

See also
 List of former United Kingdom Parliament constituencies

References

 
 Boundaries of Parliamentary Constituencies 1885-1972, compiled and edited by F.W.S. Craig (Parliamentary Reference Publications 1972)
 British Parliamentary Election Results 1832-1885, compiled and edited by F.W.S. Craig (Macmillan Press 1977)
 British Parliamentary Election Results 1885-1918, compiled and edited by F.W.S. Craig (Macmillan Press 1974)
 British Parliamentary Election Results 1918-1949, compiled and edited by F.W.S. Craig (Macmillan Press, revised edition 1977)
 Who's Who of British Members of Parliament, Volume II 1886-1918, edited by M. Stenton and S. Lees (Harvester Press 1978)
 Who's Who of British Members of Parliament, Volume III 1919-1945, edited by M. Stenton and S. Lees (Harvester Press 1979)
 Who's Who of British Members of Parliament, Volume IV 1945-1979, edited by M. Stenton and S. Lees (Harvester Press 1981)

Parliamentary constituencies in Dorset (historic)
Constituencies of the Parliament of the United Kingdom established in 1885
Constituencies of the Parliament of the United Kingdom disestablished in 1950